Ognjen Aškrabić (born July 28, 1979) is a Serbian former professional basketball player.

Professional career
While playing for Dynamo Saint Petersburg, Aškrabić won the FIBA Europe League in 2005.

National team career
Aškrabić represented Serbia and Montenegro at the EuroBasket 2003 as well as at the 2006 FIBA World Championship.

External links
 Ognjen Aškrabić at legabasket.it
 Ognjen Aškrabić at euroleague.net
 Ognjen Aškrabić at aba-league.com

1979 births
Living people
ABA League players
BC Donetsk players
BC Dynamo Saint Petersburg players
BC Zenit Saint Petersburg players
Centers (basketball)
KK Beovuk 72 players
KK FMP (1991–2011) players
Pallacanestro Virtus Roma players
Power forwards (basketball)
Serbian expatriate basketball people in Italy
Serbian expatriate basketball people in Russia
Serbian expatriate basketball people in Ukraine
Serbian men's basketball players
Basketball players from Sarajevo
2006 FIBA World Championship players
Universiade medalists in basketball
Universiade gold medalists for Serbia and Montenegro
Universiade silver medalists for Serbia and Montenegro
Medalists at the 2001 Summer Universiade
Serbs of Bosnia and Herzegovina